C. Michelle Olmstead (born 21 May 1969) is an American astronomer, asteroid discoverer and computer scientist.

Early life and education

Olmstead attended Northern Arizona University as an undergraduate student in physics and astronomy from 1989-1993, where she was a NASA undergraduate fellow and participated in several asteroid astrometry programs and made measurements using existing survey work.

Career

She is credited by the Minor Planet Center with the discovery of 46 asteroids for the period between 1977 and 1990. In 1990, with Henry E. Holt, she co-discovered 127P/Holt-Olmstead, a periodic comet that bears her name. 

The minor planet 3287 Olmstead, a Mars-crosser asteroid discovered by astronomer Schelte J. Bus in 1981, was named in her honour. Her lowest numbered discovery, officially discovered at Palomar Observatory in 1978, and presumably taken on photographic plates by Tom Gehrels shortly after the last Palomar–Leiden Survey campaign, had its discovering astrometric observation published on 12 September 1992.

References 
 

1969 births
American women astronomers
Discoverers of minor planets

Living people